The Huallaga Province is one of ten provinces of the San Martín Region in northern Peru.

Districts
Saposoa
Alto Saposoa
El Eslabón
Piscoyacu
Sacanche
Tingo de Saposoa

See also
Huallaga Valley
Huallaga River

Provinces of the San Martín Region